Michael Francis Fay (born 1960) is a British geneticist and botanist currently serving as Senior Research Leader, Conservation Genetics, at the Royal Botanic Gardens, Kew.

Life 
After studying at University College of Wales, Aberystwyth, Fay was awarded a PhD in 1989, having started working at Kew in 1986. In 2000, he was awarded the Bicentenary Medal of the Linnean Society, and has served on its governing council for several terms since 2003. He is currently Chair of the Orchid Specialist Group of the Species Survival Commission of IUCN. He serves as chief editor of the Botanical Journal of the Linnean Society. Fay researches conservation genetics.

References

Botanists active in Kew Gardens
British botanists
British geneticists
Alumni of Aberystwyth University
Living people
1960 births
British LGBT scientists
Gay academics
Gay scientists
20th-century British scientists
21st-century British scientists